Campomarino (Arbërisht: Këmarini) is an Arbëreshë comune in the Province of Campobasso, in the Italian region Molise, located about  northeast of Campobasso, and about  southeast of Termoli.

The Campomarino comune includes the seaside/tourist resort of Campomarino Lido, just above sea level, and the village of Campomarino, located on a hill behind it.

Campomarino borders the following municipalities: Chieuti, Guglionesi, Portocannone, San Martino in Pensilis, Termoli.

References

External links

 Official website

Arbëresh settlements
Cities and towns in Molise